Bouteloua gracilis, the blue grama, is a long-lived, warm-season (C4) perennial grass, native to North America.

It is most commonly found from Alberta, Canada, east to Manitoba and south across the Rocky Mountains, Great Plains, and U.S. Midwest states, onto the northern Mexican Plateau in Mexico.

Blue grama accounts for most of the net primary productivity in the shortgrass prairie of the central and southern Great Plains. It is a green or greyish, low-growing, drought-tolerant grass with limited maintenance.

Description

At the top are one to four, usually two, comb-like spikes, which extend out at a sharp angle from the flowering stem. Each spike has 20 to 90 spikelets. When the seed is mature, the whole spikelet detaches, except for the two glumes, which remain.

Blue grama is readily established from seed, but depends more on vegetative reproduction via tillers. Seed production is slow, and depends on soil moisture and temperature. Seeds dispersed by wind only reach a few meters (6 ft); farther distances are reached with insects, birds, and mammals as dispersal agents. Seedling establishment, survival, and growth are greatest when isolated from neighboring adult plants, which effectively exploit water in the seedling's root zone. Successful establishment requires a modest amount of soil moisture during the extension and development of adventitious roots.

Established plants are grazing-, cold-, and drought-tolerant, though prolonged drought leads to a reduction in root number and extent. They employ an opportunistic water-use strategy, rapidly using water when available, and becoming dormant during less-favorable conditions. In terms of successional status, blue grama is a late seral to climax species. Recovery following disturbance is slow and depends on the type and extent of the disturbance.

Distribution 
Blue grama has the widest distribution of all grama grasses. It will grow on most soil types, and readily adapts to local conditions. It can be found as far north as Alberta, and as far south as Mexico. It is present in most of the Midwestern United States, extending east to Missouri and Texas, and as far west as Southern California. It has been introduced to some eastern states, as well as South America.

Horticulture and agriculture
Blue grama is valued as forage, and is the most valuable grama. It is an ideal range grass in the southwest. It will survive heavy grazing and extreme drought, and is quite palatable to livestock. Grazing of blue grama rangelands might also prevent invasion of undesirable weedy plants.

Blue grama is grown by the horticulture industry, and used in perennial gardens, naturalistic and native plant landscaping, habitat restoration projects, and residential, civic, and highway erosion control. Blue grama flowers are also used in dried flower arrangements. Blue grama is the state grass of Colorado and New Mexico. It is listed as an endangered species in Illinois.

Blue grama has a large genome relative to other grama grasses. It can be diploid or tetraploid.

Among the Zuni people, the grass bunches are tied together and the severed end is used as a hairbrush, the other as a broom. Bunches are also used to strain goat's milk. The Costanoan, or Ohlone, use(d) the hollow stems as drinking straws. The Navajo use(d) it as sheep and horse feed.

Ecology
Blue grama is the dominant species of the US shortgrass steppe ecoregion. Populations of blue grama across the great plains are genetically differentiated (even at small spatial scales) and show functional trait variance connected to climate. Blue grama from more arid grasslands are also characterized by greater phenotypic plasticity.

It is a larval host to the Garita skipperling, green skipper, Pahaska skipper, Rhesus skipper, Simius roadside skipper, and the Uncas skipper.

References

External links

gracilis
Grasses of North America
Warm-season grasses of North America
Native grasses of the Great Plains region
Grasses of Canada
Grasses of Mexico
Grasses of the United States
Native grasses of California
Native grasses of Nebraska
Native grasses of Oklahoma
Native grasses of Texas
Flora of Mexico
Flora of the Western United States
Flora of the United States
Flora of the South-Central United States
Flora of the California desert regions
Flora of the Canadian Prairies
Flora of the Chihuahuan Desert
Flora of the Great Basin
Flora of the Great Lakes region (North America)
Flora of the Mexican Plateau
Natural history of the Mojave Desert
Plants described in 1816
Symbols of Colorado
Symbols of New Mexico
Garden plants of North America
Drought-tolerant plants
Flora without expected TNC conservation status